The Kudma (Kud'ma) is a river in Nizhny Novgorod Oblast of Russia, a right tributary of the Volga.

The Kudma rises in the south of Bogorodsk District, and flows first northward, then eastward, through Bogorodsk and Kstovo Districts, finally falling into the Volga near Leninskaya Sloboda and Kadnitsy. In Kstovo District, the Kudma forms the southern border of the Zelyony Gorod natural area, and then flows in the valley between the city of Kstovo (to the north) and Kstovo's industrial area to the south. Upstream of Kstovo, the river's waters are quite clean and transparent, and its shores attract many swimmers and sunbathers in the summertime.

References

Rivers of Nizhny Novgorod Oblast